Guillermina Rojas y Orgis was a Spanish teacher, anarchist, and feminist.

Further reading 

 
 
 
 

Spanish anarchists